Paula Anne DeMonico (born February 16, 1967), better known by her stage name Apollo Smile, is an American pop music singer-songwriter, voice actress and media personality. In the 1990s, Smile billed herself as the "Live Action Anime Girl" and was invited to several science fiction conventions as a guest. She is best known for her portrayal as reporter Ulala from the Space Channel 5 series.

Smile's notable works include Sonic & All-Stars Racing Transformed, Iria: Zeiram the Animation, Space Channel 5: Part 2, Monk, Wild Cardz, Sega Superstars Tennis, Battle Arena Toshinden, Sonic & Sega All-Stars Racing, Sega Superstars, and Voltage Fighters: Gowcaizer the Movie.

Biography
Paula Scharf was born with a twisted hip tendon, leading her mother to enroll her in physical activity at the age of three to treat it. Thus from early childhood a trained dancer and gymnast, once she graduated Guilford High School in 1985, she went to study at the University of the Arts (Philadelphia) and then the Alvin Ailey American Dance Theater in New York City. While introducing herself to a college student in New York he misheard Paula as "Apollo", and went on to say that it fit her despite being a male name as the Greek god Apollo "represents music, dance, light, and poetry", so she went with it. The latter part of her name came as a producer suggested an equally different surname, exploiting Scharf's oft-complimented smile. She legally changed her name to Apollo Smile in 1991.

An injury made Scharf opt to seek a singing career, working with producer Freddie "Groove Commander" Richmond. After contributing the song "Let's Rock" for A&M Records' soundtrack for the 1989 film Lost Angels, once a Los Angeles friend of Richmond visited his studio, she was impressed with the songs he was working with Smile, and smuggled a tape of theirs to a Geffen Records executive. Soon the A&R man went to New York to court Smile, and four months later she had signed with DGC Records. In 1990, Smile's song "Thunderbox" was featured on the soundtrack album for the Tom Cruise film Days of Thunder, and the following year she released a self-titled album, from which came the track . However, afterwards Smile was dropped along with most of DGC's signees.

By the mid-1990s, Smile was attending conventions of anime, a lifelong fandom of hers. This led to her 1996 reinvention herself as the "Live Action Anime Girl", wearing skin-tight spandex clothing, with her blonde hair in pigtails tied off with pink bows. Her appearances usually showcased music concerts featuring her original upbeat music and demonstrations of her martial arts abilities. Soon she got to work as an anime voice actress, and was called by the Sci-Fi Channel to host Anime Week in the summer of 1998.  Other projects included a self-published comic book featuring herself as the central character, and the voice of Ulala in the Space Channel 5 video game series.

In 2001, Smile was doing stunt work and voice acting and wished to return to music, and joined Virginia-based "Atari rock" band Rockbot. Smile recorded one EP with Rockbot before leaving in 2003, while continuing her stunt and acting work. As Smile's mother became ill in 2006, she returned to her hometown to tend for her. The move brought Smile's career in dance and choreography back into focus. She got a job as a dance teacher at New Haven Ballet, as well as dancing schools in Killingworth and Guilford, and choreographed various high school dances ever since. Smile was also inspired by her father with Parkinson's disease to develop a routine of dancing exercises for elders with movement-impairing illnesses such as Parkinson's and arthritis.

In 2019, she formed the music duo Wingbeat with husband Paul DeMonico.

Filmography

Film and television
Acting
 "Alana Payne" in  Drop Dead Rock (film)
 "Apollo Smile" in Sidesplitters: The Burt & Dick Story (Short film) 
 "Eva" in Division-Trade (Short film) 
 "Skater No. 2" in Monk (Episode: Mr. Monk Takes Manhattan) (uncredited) 
Stunts
Uptown Girls (film: doubling for Brittany Murphy)
Hope and Faith (TV: doubling for Kelly Ripa)
24 (TV: doubling for Elisha Cuthbert) 
The Sopranos (TV)

Voice roles
 "Additional Voices' in  Iria: Zeiram the Animation (OVA)
 "Coco Hearts" in Wild Cardz (OVA)
 "Karin Son" in Voltage Fighters: Gowcaizer the Movie (OVA)
 "Tracy" in Battle Arena Toshinden (OVA)
 "Nova" in Megas XLR
"Ulala" in Dreamcast Collection (Xbox 360, PC)
 "Ulala" and "Pudding" in Sonic & All-Stars Racing Transformed 
 "Ulala" and "Pudding" in Sega Superstars Tennis 
 "Ulala" in Sonic & Sega All-Stars Racing 
 "Ulala" in Space Channel 5 (Dreamcast, PlayStation 2)
 "Ulala" in Space Channel 5: Part 2 (Dreamcast, PlayStation 2)
 "Ulala" in Space Channel 5: Special Edition (PlayStation 2)

Discography

Apollo Smile (1991)
"Thunderbox"
"Dune Buggy"
"I Want You To Love Me"
"Love Comes Your Way"
"Theme For All Nations"
"Friends"
"Hymn To The Sun"
"Temple Of Love"
"Peace"
"Theme (Reprise)"
"Dune Buggy (Bonus Remix)"

Dune Buggy (promo CD single) (1991)
"Dune Buggy (Remix/Edit)"
"Dune Buggy (Remix/Edit without Vocal Breakdown)"
"Dune Buggy (LP Version)"
"Dune Buggy (Full Drivin' Mix)"
 Remixes by Shep Pettibone

Wrecking Ball (1997)
"Smile"
"Sunshine Slayer"
"Superball"
"TF2000"
"Love Comes Your Way"
"Aim High Get Down"
"Love Slave"
"Tired Wings"
"Shorty's Theme"
"Girl's Got Rhythm"
"Humble"
"Thanks From Apollo"

Love Kisses And Grenades (1999)
"Battle Cry"
"Hikigane"
"Feelin' Groovy"
"Purrr..."
"Last Stand in Discoland"
"Tite Pants"
"Rainbow Rider"
"T.S.T."
"Trigger Finger"
"Call Me"
"Going Back"
"Live Wire"
"Hikigane – Joe 90 Mix"
"Lets Rock"

References

External links

 Coast-Con 1999 Interview
 
 Ask John: "What Ever Happened to Apollo Smile?" at AnimeNation

1967 births
Living people
American voice actresses
American women pop singers
American video game actresses
Singers from New York City
People from Guilford, Connecticut
20th-century American actresses
20th-century American women singers
20th-century American singers
21st-century American actresses
21st-century American women singers
21st-century American singers